Kseniia Tsymbalyuk (born 8 January 1997) is a Russian female road and track cyclist, representing Russia at international competitions. She competed at the 2016 UEC European Track Championships in the team pursuit event. At the 2017 UCI Road World Championships she rode in the women's time trial event.

References

External links
 
 
 

1997 births
Living people
Russian female cyclists
Russian track cyclists
Place of birth missing (living people)